Several ships have been named Clarendon:

 was built at Bristol as a West Indiaman.
 was built at Lancaster as a West Indiaman. She spent most of her career sailing between England and Jamaica. She then became a transport based out of Hull. She wrecked on 7 April 1815 while bringing prisoners as a cartel from Bermuda to the United States.
 was launched in France in 1788, under another name. She was taken in prize in 1804. In 1805 Clarendon began a voyage as a slave ship in the triangular trade in enslaved people but fell prey to Spanish privateers after she had embarked slaves.
 was built at Whitehaven. Between 1808 or so and 1813 she sailed as a West Indiaman between London and Jamaica. In 1814 she sailed for Batavia under a license from the British East India Company (EIC). The privateer Young Wasp captured her off the Cape of Good Hope (the Cape), on 6 January 1815, and she arrived at Baltimore on 15 April.
Clarendon (APA-72) was launched 12 September 1944. On 22 May 1945, Clarendon made three voyages from San Diego and San Francisco to Pearl Harbor, carrying passengers and cargo back and forth. A county in South Carolina is named after this ship.

Citations

Ship names